Lomnice is the name of several locations in the Czech Republic:

Lomnice (Brno-Country District), a market town in the South Moravian Region
Lomnice (Bruntál District), a municipality and village in the Moravian-Silesian Region
Lomnice (Sokolov District), a municipality and village in the Karlovy Vary Region
Lomnice nad Lužnicí, a town in the South Bohemian Region
Lomnice nad Popelkou, a town in the Liberec Region

See also
Lomnica
Łomnica (disambiguation)